Zygmunt Zawirski (29 July 1882 – 2 April 1948) was a Polish philosopher and logician.

His main field of study was philosophy of physics, history of science, multi-valued logic and relation of multi-valued logic to calculus of probability.

Biography
Zawirski was born on 29 July 1882 in the village of Berezowica Mała (Mala Berezovytsia) near Zbarazh (now Ukraine). In 1928 he became a professor of the Adam Mickiewicz University in Poznań and in 1937 professor of the Jagiellonian University in Kraków. In 1936 he became an editor of Kwartalnik Filozoficzny ("Philosophical Quarterly"). After 1945, he was president of the Krakowskie Towarzystwo Filozoficzne ("Kraków Philosophical Society").

He died on 2 April 1948 in Końskie, Poland.

Notable works

References

Further reading
 
 
 

1882 births
1948 deaths
Academic staff of Jagiellonian University
Historians of science
Mathematical logicians
Academic staff of Adam Mickiewicz University in Poznań
20th-century Polish historians
Polish male non-fiction writers
Polish logicians
People from Ternopil Oblast
20th-century Polish philosophers

Philosophers of physics